Sweethearts is an American television game show which aired from September 12, 1988 to September 8, 1989. It was  based on the 1987 British series of the same name. The show was syndicated throughout the United States by Multimedia Entertainment.

Charles Nelson Reilly was the host. Richard Kline guest-hosted.

Gameplay
A sort of combination of The Dating/Newlywed Game and To Tell the Truth. Three couples each with a different story on how they met faced a panel of three celebrities, two of them were false, the other was telling the truth. Each couple came out one at a time, then each panelist asked the couple in control questions for an unlimited amount of time.

When all the couples were grilled then the panel voted on which couple's story was true. Each incorrect vote was worth $500 to the couples, later reduced to $250 per incorrect vote, and fooling the panel completely won the real couple a big trip.

Among the celebrities who appeared were, Sally Struthers, Tony Orlando, Zsa Zsa Gabor, McLean Stevenson, Phyllis Diller, Tom Poston, and Richard Simmons.

Home Viewer Sweepstakes
Home viewers had the chance to get in on the fun by playing the home viewer game. Just like the panelists on the show, home viewers must watch and listen to all three stories (one from each of the three couples) and after they have seen and heard from all three, the home viewer must then vote on which one of the three is true simply by calling their respective 900 number. The winning home viewer selected at random would win a nice prize.

British Version
The original British version produced by Anglia was hosted by Larry Grayson and announced by John Benson aired on ITV from March 31 until June 23, 1987.

References

1988 American television series debuts
1989 American television series endings
First-run syndicated television programs in the United States
1980s American game shows
American panel games
Television series by Universal Television
English-language television shows